Princess Marie Luise Charlotte of Hesse-Kassel (9 May 1814 – 28 July 1895) was a member of the House of Hesse-Kassel by birth. Through her marriage to Prince Frederick Augustus of Anhalt-Dessau, she became a princess of Anhalt-Dessau.

Family
Marie Luise Charlotte was the second child and daughter of Prince William of Hesse-Kassel and his wife Princess Louise Charlotte of Denmark. She was an elder sister of Louise of Hesse-Kassel, consort of Christian IX of Denmark: Her other siblings included Prince Frederick William of Hesse-Kassel and Princess Auguste Sophie Friederike of Hesse-Kassel.

Marriage and issue
Marie Luise Charlotte married Prince Frederick Augustus of Anhalt-Dessau, fourth but third surviving son of Frederick, Hereditary Prince of Anhalt-Dessau and his wife, Landgravine Amalie of Hesse-Homburg, on 11 September 1832 at Rumpenheimer Schloss in Offenbach am Main. The couple had three children:

 Adelaide Marie (Dessau, 25 December 1833 – Schloss Königstein, 24 November 1916); married on 23 April 1851 Adolphe, last Duke of Nassau and first Grand Duke of Luxembourg. The current Grand Duke of Luxembourg, Henri, is her direct descendant.
 Bathildis Amalgunde (Dessau, 29 December 1837 – Schloss Nachod, Bohemia, 10 February 1902); married Prince William of Schaumburg-Lippe on 30 May 1862. Her eldest daughter, Charlotte, was the wife of William II, the last King of Württemberg and, through one of her younger daughters, Adelaide, she was the grandmother of the last head of the Wettin branch of Saxe-Altenburg, George Moritz.
 Hilda Charlotte (Dessau, 13 December 1839 – Dessau, 22 December 1926).

Ancestry

References

Citations

Bibliography

 
 Haus Hessen - Biografisches Lexikon (Arbeiten der Hessischen Historischen Kommission) by Eckhart G. Franz. Darmstadt: Hessische Historische Kommission, 2012, .

1814 births
1895 deaths
House of Hesse-Kassel
House of Ascania
Nobility from Copenhagen
Landgravines of Hesse-Kassel
German people of Danish descent
German people of Norwegian descent
German people of English descent
Danish people of German descent
Danish people of English descent
Danish people of Norwegian descent
Royal reburials